Pengelly is a hamlet in north Cornwall, England, United Kingdom, part of the village and civil parish of Delabole which was until April 2021 in the parish of St Teath.

Once Pengelly was a settlement separate from the neighbouring hamlets of Medrose and Rockhead, but the three were merged with the introduction of the railway and the new village adopted the name Delabole.

There are also places called Pengelly in the parishes of Breage, Crowan and St Ewe; the meaning of Pengelly is "end/top of a grove".

References 

Philip's Navigator Britain (page 17)

Hamlets in Cornwall